St Catherine's School is an independent, co-educational school in Germiston, Gauteng named after Saint Catherine of Siena. A combined school, St Catherine's consists of a pre-school,a preparatory school and a senior school and is the oldest school in Germiston.

History

St Catherine's School was founded in 1908 by the Dominican Sisters of St. Catherine of Siena, Newcastle, Natal in order to meet the increasing demand for education in the then 22-year-old mining town of Germiston (a product of the Witwatersrand Gold Rush of the late 1880s). The original school building was located on Hardach Street in central Germiston, and was built on land bought from the Simmer and Jack gold mining company. It was the first convent on the East Rand and the first high school in Germiston.

By the 1940s, the school's environs in the Germiston CBD were undergoing rapid industrialisation, concurrent with a general shift from north to south of much of Germiston's population, and in 1948 St Catherine's School relocated to the then newly developed suburb of Parkhill Gardens. Here there was also more space for sporting facilities. The new school buildings were designed in a toned-down Romanesque Revival style, influenced by the late-nineteenth and early-twentieth century Arts and Crafts Movement, by the Irish Catholic architect Brendan Joseph Clinch – an associate of Sir Herbert Baker.

Toward the end of 1968 the school decided, in conjunction with its sister school St Dominic's in Boksburg, to cater for primary school pupils only: girls up to standard 5 (grade 7) and boys up to standard 1 (grade 3). Additionally, in 1970 the Transvaal Education Department recognised and registered the St Catherine's pre-primary school. The first reported ghost sighting at St Catherine's occurred on 17 August 1972, when a janitor cleaning the school hall after hours claimed to have been chased into the quad by an amorphous grey apparition or "spook" with "glowing red eyes". From the beginning of 1977, a wave of sightings followed of a "grey, hooded figure swaddled in flowing robes", often accompanied by a "'wailing' sound". The ghost, said to haunt the school hall, the chapel, the basement and a number of classrooms in the eastern wing, was soon dubbed Patrick, after one of the school's houses, St Patrick's. After 1977, ghost sightings at St Catherine's mostly ceased, although stories of paranormal happenings at the school persist to the present.

In 1985, the school extended its education of boys to standard 5 again. This was followed in 1991 by the Sisters of St Catherine's moving into a private house, opening up more room in the school for classrooms.

In 2001 the Board of Governors approved the re-opening of the high school, and that year saw the first intake of grade 8 pupils since 1968. At the same time the school buildings were expanded, with the construction of a new wing that was completed and fully occupied by 2007. Mrs J. Crosby, formerly of Boksburg High School, stepped in as high school principal in June 2007. In 2008 the school celebrated its centenary with a centennial mass, held under a marquee on the main soccer field which was attended by more than 800 pupils, parents, staff, past pupils and past teachers.

In December 2015, Mrs V. Johnson took charge as the Head of School to focus on whole school development. The new Preparatory School Principal, Mrs S. Rodrigues, began her term in January 2016. With the retirement of the Pre-school Principal, Mrs T. Henry (who served the school for 35 years) the new Pre-school Principal, Mrs C. Stewart, began her term in January 2016.

In May 2016, the Head of School, Mrs Johnson, announced that she would be retiring in December of the same year. She was succeeded by Mr Dennis Maritz in January 2017 as Head of School.Mr. Maritz has extensive experience in independent education. He was the Founding Head of Uplands College in White River and also served as Headmaster of St Martin's School in Johannesburg.He held the post of Headmaster of Cornwall Hill College in Pretoria prior to joining St Catherine's School as Head of School. The primary school is now known as the preparatory school and the high school is now known as the senior school. Concurrent with this restructuring, an expansion programme has been undertaken which has seen a marked increase in enrolment.

St. Catherine's entered a new phase of its development in 2019 with the construction of the Aelred O'Donovan wing which was completed at the end of 2018. The wing consists of six state-of-the-art classrooms which were built to accommodate pupils in Grades one and two. The need for the wing became apparent in 2018 with the growth in enrolment which the school was experiencing. The wing bears the name of Sister Aelred O'Donovan who was the last Newcastle Dominican Sister to hold the post of Head of School.

In 2022 the school opened and dedicated the new STEAM Centre. The facility was blessed by the Archbishop of Johannesburg, Buti Tlhagale, and unveiled by Sister Stephany Thiel, the regional prioress. The STEAM Centre consists of an art studio and exhibition area, two laboratories, a computer centre and a robotics and coding venue. The Rose Niland Bell Tower, which forms an integral part of the centre, was erected to honour the school's founder, Mother Rose Niland.

Heritage status
The Johannesburg Heritage Foundation has recognised the historical and architectural significance of the St Catherine's School buildings, conferring a blue plaque on the school in 2021.

Academics

St Catherine's matriculants and grade 9 pupils write exams set by the Independent Examinations Board (IEB). The IEB is an organisation whose examinations are written by independent schools throughout South Africa. These examinations conform to the requirements of the National Senior Certificate and are recognised both internationally and by all South African universities.

The subjects taken from grades 1 to 3 (junior phase) are:
English
Afrikaans
Zulu
Mathematics
Religious education
Life orientation
Physical education
Music
Computer studies

The compulsory subjects for Grade 4 to 6 (Intermediate Phase) and Grade 7 (Senior Phase) are:
English
Afrikaans (first additional language)
isiZulu (second additional language)
Mathematics
Natural sciences
Geography
History
Technology
Life orientation
Religious education
Music
Drama
Art
Computer studies
Economic and management science (Grade 7 Only)
Physical education

The subjects offered from grade 8 to Matric at St Catherine's are:
Accounting
Afrikaans (second language)
Business studies
CAT (Grade 10 – 12)
English (compulsory)
Geography
History
Creative arts (grades 8–9) and Visual arts (grades 10–12)
isiZulu (second language)
Life orientation (compulsory)
Mathematics or Mathematical literacy
Life sciences
Physical science
Religious education (compulsory)

Houses
The school is divided into three houses, namely:
St Catherine's (yellow)
St Dominic's (red)
St Patrick's (green)

These three houses regularly engage in inter-house events, including: athletics, a swimming gala, bible quiz, public speaking and fundraising. Activities may differ between school grades and phases.

Sport

St Catherine's pupils also participate in a wide variety of sports. Sports at the school include soccer, cricket, tennis, netball, athletics and swimming. There are both male and female soccer teams representing the school with the girls' soccer team being a new addition, nicknamed the 'Saint's Soccer Team'. St Catherine's has also, since 2007, been competing in the Germiston inter-high swimming gala, where it has been somewhat successful.

Notable alumni
 Tumi Mothei, entrepreneur and former guitarist of the band Heroes Wear Red.

References

External links
St. Catherine's official site
Independent Schools Association of Southern Africa (ISASA)
Catholic Schools Office (CSO)

1908 establishments in South Africa
Educational institutions established in 1908
Private schools in Gauteng
Schools in Germiston
Heritage buildings in the East Rand
Reportedly haunted locations in South Africa